Jane Bartle-Wilson (born 14 February 1951 in Harrogate, West Riding of Yorkshire) was a former Olympian, competing in the 1984 Los Angeles games with her horse Pinocchio, in the individual dressage event. Jane is sister to Badminton winner, Christopher Bartle.

Competitor
Jane competed internationally in dressage:

Member of the British Dressage Team from 1982 to 1987
Competed in the Los Angeles Olympics, 1984 with her horse Pinocchio
National Dressage Champion in 1983 and 1986

Trainer
Bartle-Wilson has trained many top riders including Karen Dixon who was a member of the British Olympic Three Day Event Team in Seoul, Barcelona, Atlanta and Sydney Olympics.

She was the Chef d'Equipe to the British Dressage Team 1993–2000.

Citations

References
 
 

Living people
1951 births
British dressage riders
Olympic equestrians of Great Britain
British female equestrians
Equestrians at the 1984 Summer Olympics